Ernest Barnes (8 January 1884 – 28 August 1956) was a British track and field athlete who competed in the 1908 Summer Olympics. He finished 13th in the Men's Marathon.

References

External links
Olympic profile

1884 births
1956 deaths
Olympic athletes of Great Britain
Athletes (track and field) at the 1908 Summer Olympics
British male marathon runners